is a shōjo manga series written and illustrated by Kiyoko Arai. It originally ran in the Japanese manga magazine Ciao. Beauty Pop is published in English by VIZ Media under the Shojo Beat label and in French by Soleil Manga. The manga focuses on the life of a naturally talented hairstylist named Kiri Koshiba and her problems with the "Scissors Project," a group of boys determined to become the best makeover team in Japan. Beauty Pop went on a short hiatus from Ciao, but it came back under the title Beauty Pop Stage 2. The series has also been adapted into a Drama CD, which was released on 25 November 2004.

Plot

High School student Kiri Koshiba uses her hairstyling talents to help brighten up the lives of girls often deemed as “ugly,” but she does so anonymously. Due to her skill, Kiri unintentionally becomes rival to the Scissors Project (also known as the SP), an infamous club consisting of self-proclaimed genius hairstylist Shougo Narumi, cosmetic expert Kazuhiko Ochiai, and nail artist Kei Minami. The Scissors Project is known for their showy performances where they give public makeovers to members of the student body, specifically already “beautiful” girls, and as a result attract an often-times overwhelming amount of attention.

After the rejection of Kiri’s friend Kanako Aoyama when she professes her love to Ochiai, Kiri gives her a makeover in order to help boost her self-esteem. Interpreting this as a challenge to the supremacy of the SP, Narumi issues a formal challenge to the offender, whom he refers to as “X” due to their anonymity to ensure that his club remains on top. After “X” defeats Narumi and is revealed to be Kiri Koshiba, Kiri eventually becomes a reluctant member of the SP, whether or not Narumi approves.

Throughout the series, the SP continues to grow and meet the challenges of becoming the top team of beauticians in Japan, unless their interpersonal issues get in the way.

Characters

A cute and technically gifted hair stylist who uses her talents to improve the lives of those she encounters, typically after witnessing her clients getting ridiculed or abused for their appearance. Her goal becomes to spread “a little magic” by giving her clients a neat hairstyle.

The vain, handsome, and temperamental main hair stylist of the Scissors Project. Although he is fiercely competitive in comparison to the majority of the other characters, he is the most amenable member of his own family.

The overall beauty consultant of the group. He is the brains behind the operation and acts like a human computer, with "data" on every girl in the school. He is also responsible for make-up on the team and is aided by the products from his parents' company.

The member of the Scissors Project that does nail art. Kei is very energetic and often seen eating junk food and candy. Kei likes to come up with nicknames for his friends like 'Naru-Naru' and 'Narurin' for Narumi while he calls Ochiai 'Occhi'. He also serves as emcee for any Scissors Project event, announcing the model and occasionally commenting while Narumi cuts.

A friend of Kiri's who admires her talents. Kanako tends to be quite shy and bookish. When she was rejected by Kazuhiko Ochiai, Kiri gave her a makeover to teach the Scissors Project a lesson. After SP's initial model in the final competition backs out, she ends up filling in.

Kiri's childhood friend and neighbor. Kiri calls him "Shimatarou" or "Taro-Tard", which annoys him very much. Taro is a big fan of the Scissor Project, and he wants to be a beautician as a result even though he lacks the skill.

 Kiri's fat pet cat. Shampoo was first a stray who would not trust anyone because she had a bad past. When she met Kiri, Shampoo scratched her hand. However, she realizes that Kiri was not like the other people that she had seen, who had been mean and heartless. 

Kiri's childhood friend who recently moved back to Japan from New York. His father specializes in making aromatherapy oils and perfumes. He is apparently in love with Kiri's mom and is very affectionate of Kiri.

Kiri's father who owns the Koshiba Beauty Salon and was the one to train Kiri in the art of hairstyling.

Kiri's mother is a famous special effects make-up artist in Hollywood.

Kiri's childhood friend. He is highly regarded as part of the Seki Clinic, which specializes in invigorating massage due to his 'Hands of God'. His calm personality tends to make even the angriest people around him calm.

Narumi's younger sister, who Kiri indifferently "saves" one day when her hair was tangled in a bush. As a result, Chisami seems to think that Kiri is her Prince Charming (as she thought Kiri was a boy).

A famous hairstylist from LA who is always shown with headphones around his neck. His parents were close friends of Kiri's parents and famous stylists in L.A., who died in an accident when he was a child. Billy works for Narumi's father.

Media

Manga
Beauty Pop ran in Ciao magazine for a total of 51 chapters, later bound into 10 volumes by publisher Shogakukan. Viz Media licensed the manga for an English release under their Shojo Beat line.
The series underwent a short hiatus from Ciao, but came back in the October 2006, under the new title Beauty Pop Stage 2, though the volumes themselves stayed under the name Beauty Pop. The manga was also published in Vietnam by TVM Comics and France by Soleil Productions.

Volume listing

Drama CD
The series has also been adapted into a drama CD, which was released on November 25, 2004. The drama features Junko Minagawa as Kiri Koshiba, Tomokazu Seki as Shogo Narumi, Aoki Makoto as Kazuhiko Ochiai, Hiro Shimono as Kei Minami, Masayo Kurata as Kanako Aoyama, Hiroshi Shimozaki as Taro Komatsu, and Mitsuaki Hoshino as Seiji Koshiba.

References

External links
Official page at Shojo Beat

Fictional beauticians
Romantic comedy anime and manga
Shogakukan manga
Shōjo manga
Viz Media manga